South Brooksville is a census-designated place (CDP) in Hernando County, Florida, United States. The population was 4,007 at the 2010 census. It is a suburb included in the Tampa-St. Petersburg-Clearwater, Florida Metropolitan Statistical Area.

Geography
South Brooksville is in the east-central part of Hernando County, located at  (28.543005, -82.394738). It borders the city of Brooksville to the southwest, south, and southeast. It is in turn bordered to the south and west by unincorporated Spring Hill, and to the west by Wiscon.

U.S. Route 41 crosses the central portion of the CDP, leading north into Brooksville and south  to Masaryktown. Florida State Road 50 crosses the northern portions of the CDP, leading east  to Ridge Manor and west  to Weeki Wachee.

Demographics

As of the census of 2000, there were 1,376 people, 559 households, and 386 families residing in the CDP. The racial makeup of the CDP was 58.72% White, 37.35% African American, 0.15% Native American, 0.44% Asian, 1.16% from other races, and 2.18% from two or more races. Hispanic or Latino of any race were 4.36% of the population.

There were 559 households, out of which 29.0% had children under the age of 18 living with them, 43.3% were married couples living together, 20.2% had a female householder with no husband present, and 30.8% were non-families. 25.8% of all households were made up of individuals, and 14.3% had someone living alone who was 65 years of age or older.  The average household size was 2.46 and the average family size was 2.93.

In the CDP, the population was spread out, with 25.9% under the age of 18, 8.6% from 18 to 24, 23.6% from 25 to 44, 23.0% from 45 to 64, and 18.8% who were 65 years of age or older.  The median age was 39 years. For every 100 females, there were 84.5 males.  For every 100 females age 18 and over, there were 80.7 males.

The median income for a household in the CDP was $28,073, and the median income for a family was $25,956. Males had a median income of $27,292 versus $20,938 for females. The per capita income for the CDP was $15,758.  About 11.5% of families and 16.1% of the population were below the poverty line, including 16.9% of those under age 18 and 11.7% of those age 65 or over.

See also
 South Brooksville Avenue Historic District

References

Census-designated places in Hernando County, Florida
Census-designated places in Florida